Manuel Frederick (born 20 October 1947) is an Indian field hockey player who played as goalkeeper from Kannur district in Kerala. He won a bronze medal at the 1972 Summer Olympics in Munich. He is the 1st Keralite to win an Olympic medal. The second Keralite to win an Olympic medal is P. R. Sreejesh who won a Bronze on 5th Aug 2021 in Tokyo Olympics. Both medals for Kerala have come via the goalkeepers of the National Hockey Team.

In 2019, he was awarded Dhyan Chand Award for Lifetime Achievement in Sports and Games by Ministry of Youth Affairs and Sports.

Biography
Manuel Frederick was born on 1947 October 20, at Burnasserry in Kannur district of Kerala state to Joseph and Sara. Before started playing hockey, he used to play football for B.M.P U.P School in Kannur.

References

External links
 Manuel Frederick at DatabaseOlympics.com
 

1948 births
Living people
Olympic field hockey players of India
Field hockey players at the 1972 Summer Olympics
Indian male field hockey players
Olympic bronze medalists for India
Olympic medalists in field hockey
Field hockey players from Kerala
People from Kannur district
Medalists at the 1972 Summer Olympics
Recipients of the Dhyan Chand Award